India Telecom is an annual trade show for the telecommunications industry in India. Held at the Pragati Maidan showgrounds in New Delhi in December, 2010 was the fifth edition of the exhibition.

Exhibition dates
2009: 3–5 December
2010: 9–11 December
2011: To be determined

Trade fairs in India